Pablo Leandro Gómez (born 16 July 1997) is an Argentine professional footballer who plays as a forward for Liga MX club Querétaro. He is the son of deceased footballer Pablo Hernán Gómez. Together with his sister, Gómez survived the automobile accident which killed his parents.

Career statistics

Club

Notes

References

1997 births
Living people
Argentine footballers
Argentine expatriate footballers
Association football forwards
Club Puebla players
Cimarrones de Sonora players
Ascenso MX players
Liga MX players
Argentine expatriate sportspeople in Mexico
Expatriate footballers in Mexico
Sportspeople from Mendoza, Argentina